Events from the year 1705 in Ireland.

Incumbent
Monarch: Anne

Events
 November 5 – The Dublin Gazette, the official newspaper of the British Government in Ireland, publishes its first edition.
 Royal Mines Act enacted.

Births
Constantia Grierson, editor, poet and classical scholar (d. 1732)

Deaths
March 10 – John Temple, lawyer and politician (b. 1632)
July 29 – Richard Tennison, Church of Ireland Bishop of Meath (b. 1642)
December 25 – Nehemiah Donnellan, lawyer (b. 1649)
Diarmuid mac Sheáin Bhuí Mac Cárthaigh, poet.

Footnotes

 
Years of the 18th century in Ireland
Ireland
1700s in Ireland